
Rimba may refer to:

Places

Brunei 
 Kampong Rimba, village outside Bandar Seri Begawan

Indonesia 
 Rimba Raya Biodiversity Reserve, a forest reserve in Kalimantan

Malaysia 
 Kenong Rimba Park, a protected rainforest park
 Rimba Ilmu Botanical Gardens, Kuala Lumpur
 Taman Rimba Komanwel, a park in Selayang, Selangor

People 
 Miguel Rimba, a former Bolivian football player
 Orang Rimba, a group of nomadic people in Sumatra, Indonesia

In arts and entertainment 
 Poetri Rimba, a 1941 Indonesian film
 Rimba (animation), Indonesian computer animated TV series
 Rimba Racer, a 2014 Malaysian computer-animated TV series
 Rimba Grand Prix, fictional company and the series' primary setting
 Rimba News Network, fictional sports channel